The Attachment is a 2018 Burmese drama film, directed by  Ban Gyi starring Khine Htoo Thar, Zar Ti, Nan Su Oo, May Thinzar Oo, Khin Zarchi Kyaw, Cho Pyone and May Paing Soe. The film, produced by Zayyar Shwe Pyi Film Production premiered in Myanmar on May 18, 2018.

Cast
Khine Htoo Thar as The Monk, Wunna Thiri
Zar Ti as Monk#
Nan Su Oo as Pyae Sone Khin
Khin Zarchi Kyaw as Khin Hmone
Cho Pyone as Granny
May Paing Soe as Sister of Pyae Sone Khin
Nyein Chan as The Villager#1
Myo Myo Khine as The Villager#2
Nine Nine Htet as Novice Monk, Wunna Thiri

References

2018 films
2010s Burmese-language films
Burmese drama films
Films shot in Myanmar